A salmon burger is a type of fishcake made mostly from salmon in the style of a hamburger. The salmon requires a binder to make it stick together and is easy to overcook which makes it too dry.  Salmon burgers are especially common in Alaska where they are routinely offered as an alternative to beef hamburgers.

See also

 List of hamburgers
 List of sandwiches

References

Salmon dishes
Seafood sandwiches
Hamburgers (food)